Heuliez was a French carrosserie that worked as a production and design unit for various automakers. It specialized in producing short series for niche markets, such as convertibles or station-wagons.

The business activity ended on 31 October 2013.   The company's plant and buildings have been taken over by the "Fabrique régionale du Bocage", a quasi-company which has the regional government of Poitou-Charentes as its majority shareholder.

History
Heuliez was created in 1920 by Adolphe Heuliez, who started by making horse-drawn carts.  As early as 1925, he assembled his first car, a Peugeot 177B.  He also created a subsidiary company for the production of buses, which was later sold in 1980 and trades as Heuliez Bus.

Toward the end, however, the main product of Heuliez was the retractable roof made for the Peugeot 206 CC, with 350,000 units being produced.  It also produced entire cars, such as the Opel Tigra.  Since 1985, Heuliez has produced more than 450,000 cars, with a staff of over 2,000.

Poor sales of the Tigra forced Heuliez to reduce its staff by 541 and Opel asked Heuliez to reduce its output from 200 to 50 cars/day until the end of 2006.

In October 2007, Heuliez asked for protection from creditors. In July 2008, Argentum Motors committed itself to invest 10 million Euros in the business, with a further 10 million Euros during the ensuing five years, in return for 60% of the company's capital, but the agreement was not followed through.

The main production plant is located in Cerizay in the Deux-Sèvres département. The president of Heuliez is Paul Quéveau.

In 2010, Heuliez went out of the convertible rooftop-making business, and the electric vehicle elements were acquired by the Franco-German group Baelen Gaillard Industrie-ConEnergy-Kohl and were renamed Mia electric which itself ceased business in 2014.

Production
Citroën BX Station Wagon (1985–1994)
Citroën Visa Chrono (1984)
Citroën Visa Mille Pistes (1984)
Citroën Visa Convertible (1984)
Citroën BX 4TC (1986)
Citroën CX Break (1989–1991)
Citroën XM Break (1992–2000)
Citroën Xantia Break (1995–2001)
Opel Tigra TwinTop (2004–2009)
Peugeot 206 CC (2000–2007)
Peugeot 604 Limousine (1978–1984)
Peugeot 205 Turbo 16 road cars
Renault 5 Turbo

Electric vehicles
Heuliez Friendly, becoming Mia electric
Heuliez Pondicherry, neighborhood all-electric urban pick-up prototype

See also
Active Wheel as used in the Heuliez WILL concept car
Henri Chapron also in France
Karmann in Germany
Magna Steyr in Austria
Bertone and Pininfarina in Italy
Valmet Automotive in Finland

References

Defunct motor vehicle manufacturers of France
Convertible top suppliers
Coachbuilders of France
Contract vehicle manufacturers
Companies based in Nouvelle-Aquitaine